The Hale-Whitney Mansion, is located in Bayonne, Hudson County, New Jersey, United States. The building was built in 1869 and was added to the National Register of Historic Places on June 7, 1996.

See also
National Register of Historic Places listings in Hudson County, New Jersey

References

External links
 View of Hale-Whitney Mansion via Google Street View

Buildings and structures in Bayonne, New Jersey
Houses on the National Register of Historic Places in New Jersey
Houses completed in 1869
Houses in Hudson County, New Jersey
National Register of Historic Places in Hudson County, New Jersey
Second Empire architecture in New Jersey
1869 establishments in New Jersey
New Jersey Register of Historic Places